Louis Edward Vedder (April 20, 1897 – March 9, 1990) was a professional baseball and American football player. He appeared in one game in Major League Baseball for the Detroit Tigers during the 1920 season as a relief pitcher. Listed at 5' 10", 175 lb., he batted and threw right-handed. He also played for the Buffalo Bisons of the National Football League as a fullback in 1927.

Born in Oakville, Michigan, Lou Vedder played just one game of professional baseball, but it was at the major league level. On September 18, 1920 Vedder pitched two perfect innings of relief for the Tigers in a 7–4 defeat to the visiting Boston Red Sox at Navin Field. He faced the minimum of six batters, striking out one of them, and never appeared in a major league game again.

Vedder was a longtime resident of Lake Placid, Florida, where he died at the age of 92.

Sources

Major League Baseball pitchers
Detroit Tigers players
American football fullbacks
Buffalo Bisons (NFL) players
Baseball players from Michigan
1897 births
1990 deaths